Hard Spell is a United Kingdom televised spelling bee programme for children between the ages of eleven and fourteen, presented by Eamonn Holmes, with Nina Hossain reading the words. It was first broadcast on BBC One in late 2004. Heats were held in different parts of the country leading to the grand final, at the end of which Gayathri Kumar was crowned Britain's best young speller.

Notable spellers apart from Gayathri included Jade Bullock, Nisha Abraham-Thomas from Wolverhampton, Mark Jackson from Cambridge, Dominic Harvey from Bath, Sarah Williams from Penzance, Jack Jarvis from Chesterfield and Anthony Collins from Barnes.

All of the televised runners-up in 2004 received a signed photograph of Eamonn Holmes and other Hard Spell memorabilia.

Soon after, the BBC produced a one-off episode of Star Spell, which followed the same format but had celebrities taking part rather than children. This was again presented by Eamonn Holmes, with Nina Hossain reading the words. The one-off episode was won by Richard Whiteley. In late 2005, the BBC broadcast a full series of Star Spell, again presented by Eamonn Holmes but Mishal Husain took over from Nina as word pronouncer.

As the show was such a success, Hard Spell returned to television screens at Christmas 2005 with a different age group (11-13) but the same presenters, Eamonn Holmes and Mishal Husain. In the final, the winner was Niall O'Neill from Northern Ireland who won £10,000 worth of holiday vouchers and media equipment for his school. In 2005 the memorabilia contained a Hard Spell T-shirt, mug, pencil case, pen and a dictionary signed by the presenter.

References

External links 
 

BBC television game shows
2004 British television series debuts
2004 British television series endings